This is a list of awards and nominations received by Toni Braxton, an American R&B/pop singer.

American Music Awards

|-
|rowspan="3"|1994
|rowspan="3"|Toni Braxton
|Favorite Adult Contemporary New Artist
|
|-
|Favorite Soul/R&B New Artist
|
|-
|Favorite Soul/R&B Female Artist
|
|-
|rowspan="2"|1995
|Toni Braxton
|Favorite Soul/R&B Female Artist
|
|-
|Toni Braxton
|Favorite Soul/R&B Album
|
|-
|rowspan="2"|1997
|Toni Braxton
|Favorite Soul/R&B Female Artist
|
|-
|Secrets
|Favorite Soul/R&B Album
|
|-
|rowspan="2"|1998
|rowspan="2"|Toni Braxton
|Favorite Pop/Rock Female Artist
|
|-
|Favorite Soul/R&B Female Artist
|
|-
|rowspan="2"|2001
|Toni Braxton
|Favorite Soul/R&B Female Artist
|
|-
|The Heat
|Favorite Soul/R&B Album
|
|-

Billboard Music Awards

BRIT Awards

|-
|1997
|Toni Braxton
|Best International Female
|

Echo Awards

|-
|1998
|Toni Braxton
|Best International Pop/Rock Female Artist
|

End of the Year Billboard history

1994
 Top R&B Artist – Female (singles & albums)
 Top R&B Album Artist – Female

1997
 Top Hot 100 Singles Artist – Female
 Top R&B Artist – Female (singles & albums)
 Top Hot R&B Singles Artist – Female
 Top Hot Dance Club Play Artist
 Top Hot Dance Club Play Single (Un-break My Heart)
 Top Hot Adult Contemporary Artist
 Top Hot Adult Contemporary Track (Un-Break My Heart)

2000
 Top R&B/Hip-Hop Artist – Female
 Top R&B/Hip-Hop Album Artist – Female,
 Top Hot R&B/Hip-Hop Singles & Tracks Artist – Female

Grammy Awards
The Grammy Awards are awarded annually by the National Academy of Recording Arts and Sciences. Braxton has won seven awards from thirteen nominations, including Best New Artist.

|-
|rowspan="2"|1994
|Toni Braxton
|Best New Artist
|
|-
|rowspan="1"|"Another Sad Love Song"
|Best R&B Vocal Performance, Female
|
|-
|rowspan="1"|1995
|rowspan="1"|"Breathe Again"
|Best Female R&B Vocal Performance
|
|-
|rowspan="1"|1996
|rowspan="1"|"I Belong to You"
|Best Female R&B Vocal Performance
|
|-
|rowspan="3"|1997
|rowspan="1"|"Un-Break My Heart"
|Best Female Pop Vocal Performance
|
|-
|rowspan="1"|"You're Makin' Me High"
|Best Female R&B Vocal Performance
|
|-
|rowspan="1"|Secrets
|Best Pop Vocal Album
|
|-
|rowspan="2"|2001
|rowspan="1"|"He Wasn't Man Enough"
|Best Female R&B Vocal Performance
|
|-
|The Heat
|Best R&B Album
|
|-
|rowspan="1"|2015
|rowspan="1"|Love, Marriage & Divorce (with Babyface)
|Best R&B Album
|
|-
| align="center" rowspan="3"| 2019
| Sex & Cigarettes
| Best R&B Album
| 
|-
| rowspan="2"|"Long as I Live"
| Best R&B Performance
| 
|-
| Best R&B Song
| 
|-

MTV Europe Music Awards

|-
|rowspan="1"|1996
|Toni Braxton
|Best Female
|
|-
|rowspan="2"|1997
|rowspan="2"|Toni Braxton
|Best Female
|
|-
|Best R&B
|
|-

MTV Video Music Awards

|-
|rowspan="1"|1994
|"Breathe Again"
|Best R&B Video
|
|-
|rowspan="1"|1996
|"You're Makin' Me High"
|Best R&B Video
|
|-
|rowspan="2"|1997
|rowspan="2"|"Un-Break My Heart"
|Best Female Video
|
|-
|Best R&B Video
|
|-
|rowspan="2"|2000
|rowspan="2"|"He Wasn't Man Enough"
|Best Female Video
|
|-
|Best R&B Video
|
|-

NAACP Image Awards

|-
|rowspan="1"|1994
|Toni Braxton
|Outstanding Female Artist
|
|-
|rowspan="2"|1997
|Toni Braxton
|Outstanding Female Artist
|
|-
|"Un-Break My Heart" 
|Outstanding Music Video
|
|-
|rowspan="1"|2001
|Toni Braxton
|Outstanding Female Artist
|
|-
|rowspan="1"|2006
|Toni Braxton
|Outstanding Female Artist
|
|-
|rowspan="2"|2015
|"Love, Marriage & Divorce" 
|Outstanding Duo or Group
|
|-
|"Love, Marriage & Divorce" 
|Outstanding Album
|
|-
|rowspan="2"|2019
|Toni Braxton
|Outstanding Actress in a Television Movie, Limited-Series or Dramatic Special
|
|-
|"Long As I Live" 
|Outstanding Song – Traditional
|
|-
|rowspan="2"|2021
|"Live Out Your Love" 
|Outstanding Duo or Group or Collaboration (Traditional)
|

Soul Train Music Awards

|-
| rowspan="1"| 1993 
| "Love Shoulda Brought You Home" 
| Best R&B/Soul Single, Female 
| 
|-
| rowspan="4"| 1994 
| rowspan="3"| "Breathe Again" 
| Best R&B/Soul Song of the Year 
| 
|-
| Best R&B/Soul Music Video 
| 
|-
| Best R&B/Soul Single, Female 
| 
|-
| rowspan="1"| Toni Braxton 
| Best R&B Album of the Year, Female 
| 
|-
| rowspan="1"| 1995 
| "You Mean the World to Me" 
| Best R&B/Soul Single, Female 
| 
|-
| rowspan="2"| 1997 
| "You're Makin' Me High/Let It Flow" 
| Best R&B/Soul Single, Female 
| 
|-
| Secrets 
| Best R&B Album of the Year, Female 
| 
|-
| rowspan="1"| 2001 
| rowspan="1"| The Heat
| Best R&B Album of the Year, Female 
| 
|-
| 2017
| Toni Braxton
| Legend Award 
| 
|-

External links
Toni Braxton Awards History

Braxton, Toni
Awards